Chichimilá Municipality (In the Yucatec Maya Language: “hard to see or recognize”) is one of the 106 municipalities in the Mexican state of Yucatán containing  (358.59 km2) of land and located roughly 170 km southeast of the city of Mérida.

History
It is unknown which chieftainship the area was under prior to the arrival of the Spanish. After the conquest the area became part of the encomienda system with the records indicating Micaela Alcocer rented her encomienda to Manuel Argaís y Noguera and Juana de Argaís y Noguera.

Yucatán declared its independence from the Spanish Crown in 1821 and in 1825, the area was assigned to the Valladolid region.  During the Caste War of Yucatán Manuel Antonio Ay, a local chieftain, was one of the main promoters of the rebellion by the indigenous people against the government. It was designated as its own municipality in 1875.

Governance
The municipal president is elected for a three-year term. The town council has seven councilpersons, who serve as Secretary and councilors of urban development, education, health, beautification and trash disposal, public monuments and nomenclature.

Communities
The head of the municipality is Chichimilá, Yucatán.  There are 40 populated places in the municipality with the most important being Celtún, Chan-Xcail, Chay, Dzitox, Monte Verde, San Jose Cruz, San Pedro, Santa Cruz, and Villahermosa. The significant populations are shown below:

Local festivals
Every year from the 1 to the 18 February the town holds a traditional village festival and in October, a celebration for its patron saint, St. Francis of Assisi.

Tourist attractions
 Convent of the Assumption, built in the sixteenth century
 Cenote Aktun
 Cenote Chan mú ul 
 Cenote Chan Pich
 Cenote Chay
 Cenote Chichimilá

References

Municipalities of Yucatán